Wabuska is an unincorporated community in Lyon County, Nevada, United States. The zip code is 89447, which it shares with nearby Yerington.

Wabuska (Washo language,  White Grass) was established in the early 1870s. A post office was opened on September 18, 1874.  In 1881, the town served as the principal Mason Valley supply center on the newly constructed  Carson and Colorado Railroad of a line that went from Hazen to Mina.  When copper was discovered in Mason Valley, the town became the northern terminus of the new Nevada Copper Belt Railroad, built 1909–1911. Wabuska waned with declining mining activity in the 1920s.

Several buildings from Wabuska, most notably the Wabuska Railroad Station, were relocated to Carson City and incorporated as the Nevada State Railroad Museum.

Geography
Wabuska's latitude is 39.143N and the longitude is -119.182W. Wabuska's elevation is 4,295 feet above sea level.

Climate
Wabuska experiences a desert climate and has a Köppen Climate Classification of Bwk.

References

External links
http://www.epodunk.com/cgi-bin/genInfo.php?locIndex=17756
http://www.hometownlocator.com/City/Wabuska-Nevada.cfm

Unincorporated communities in Lyon County, Nevada
Unincorporated communities in Nevada
1870s establishments in Nevada
Populated places established in the 1870s